The Spindle Sect is an alternative metal band originally from Cape Town, South Africa, now based in the United Kingdom. They combine alternative metal, hip hop and various heavy subgenres, such as metalcore and hardcore punk, with elements of various electronic bass music genres, such as breakbeat, big beat, electronica, trance, industrial, drum and bass and dubstep.

The band played a key role in the revival of the live music scene in Cape Town circa 2002, drawing sell out crowds to their debut shows and often cited as "ahead of their time".

After the band's relocation to the UK, they quickly earned themselves a spot on the Feedme Music roster alongside One Minute Silence, Senser, The Algorithm and Starseed. This led to the band supporting Ill Niño and Breed 77 at Kick Out The Jams Festival, two national tours with Hed PE and Senser, respectively, and a slot at Guernsey Festival alongside Hadouken. The band has since been playlisted on national radio with XFM, Kerrang!, and TotalRock Radio (Bloodstock Radio).

2012 saw the release of the band's debut album Bubonic Tronic, which was mixed in L.A. by Dave Schiffman and mastered by Howie Weinberg.

Band members
 Darren Carikas – bass, programming, synthesizer 
 Garreth Carikas – lead vocals, programming, synthesizer
 Jerry Sudowski – drums
 Andy Czaplewski – guitars

Discography

 "Episode One" (2004)
 Is Your Planet Safe? (2009)
 "Escape Route" (2012)
 Bubonic Tronic (2012)
 The Fractured EP (2012)
 NXTGENSS EP (2014)

References

External links
 The Spindle Sect Official Website
 The Spindle Sect Official Facebook
  Clink Magazine Introducing Article
 The South African Global Newspaper Interview
 Musicreview.co.za Bubonic Tronic Review
 Raw Ramp Magazine Single Review
 Hed PE Event Listing
 MusicReview Interview

Alternative hip hop groups
Alternative metal musical groups
Nu metal musical groups
Rap metal musical groups
South African alternative rock groups
South African heavy metal musical groups
South African hip hop groups